The Pigskin Palooka is a 1937 Our Gang short comedy film directed by Gordon Douglas.  It was the 159th Our Gang short (160th episode, 70th talking short, and 71st talking episode) that was released.

Plot
Having written of his football heroics in military school, Alfalfa returns home to a hero's welcome. But the fact is that Alfalfa never played a game in his life and borrowed Rex's, a classmate and football player's uniform to take a picture, angering him as well. No sooner has he stepped off the train than his old pal Spanky, manager of the gang's football team, informs Alfalfa that he's been slated to be star player in an upcoming gridiron battle—which is to be staged within the next few hours. Alfalfa winds up winning the game in a total fluke, which Buckwheat and Porky helped cause.

Cast

The Gang
 Carl Switzer as Alfalfa
 Darla Hood as Darla
 Eugene Lee as Porky
 George McFarland as Spanky
 Billie Thomas as Buckwheat
 Pete The Pup as himself

Additional cast
 Rex Downing as Cadet (photographer)
 Gary Jasgur as Junior (timekeeper)
 Cullen Johnson as Scorekeeper
 Dickie Jones as Spike
 Sidney Kibrick as Spike's sidekick
 Delmar Watson as Captain of the military academy's football team

Members of Spanky's team
Daniel Boone, John Collum, Charles Flickinger, Larry Harris, Paul Hilton, Darwood Kaye, Tommy McFarland, Donald Proffitt, Drew Roddy, Harold Switzer

Members of Spike's team
Hugh Chapman, Dix Davis, Barry Downing, Roger McGee, Fred Walburn, Robert Winkler

Game spectators and band players
Barry Downing, Bobby Callahan, Dix Davis, Floyd Fisher, Vincent Graeff, Payne B. Johnson, Henry Lee, Joe Levine, Priscilla Lyon, Drew Roddy, Norman Salling, Joe Straunch, Jr., Fred Walburn, Robert Winckler

See also
 Our Gang filmography

References

External links
 
 

1937 films
American black-and-white films
1937 comedy films
Films directed by Gordon Douglas
Hal Roach Studios short films
Our Gang films
1930s American films
1930s English-language films